The Greenlandic Football Championship is the premier men's football competition in Greenland. It was established in 1954 and since 1971, it has been organised by the Football Association of Greenland. This association is not a part of FIFA or any other continental confederations. B-67 is the most successful football team to have won the championship.

Format 
The championship is often called an unusual and unique tournament as the finals last only one week. This is because football clubs in the large country are so far apart. Greenland has no roads between cities, so expensive air or lengthy sea travel is needed. Therefore the competition has several regional qualifiers, hosted at a single location, before the finals of 8 teams (as of 2022) are hosted at a single location, which changes year-on-year. These locations have included Ammassalik, Nanortalik and Kangaatsiaq.

Previous winners
List of Greenlandic Champions

By numbers of wins

See also 

 Association football in Greenland
 ConIFA
 Greenland Cup

References

External links
Greenland Football Association official website

Football competitions in Greenland
 
Greenland-related lists
Top level association football leagues in North America